The 2011 Ivan Hlinka Memorial Tournament was an under-18 ice hockey tournament held in Břeclav, Czech Republic and Piešťany, Slovakia from August 8–13, 2011.  As in 2010, the venues were Alcaplast Arena in Břeclav and Patrícia Ice Arena 37 in Piešťany. Canada won gold for the fourth consecutive year, defeating Sweden 4–1 in the final after losing to them 5–1 in their opening game. After their championship win, Canadian head coach Steve Spott attributed their success to a balanced attack in the absence of any one superstar.

Preliminary round

Group A

Group B

Final round

Seventh place game

Fifth place game

Semifinal 1

Semifinal 2

Bronze medal game

Gold medal game

Final standings

See also
2011 IIHF World U18 Championships
2011 World Junior Championships

References

Ivan
2011
International ice hockey competitions hosted by Slovakia
International ice hockey competitions hosted by the Czech Republic
Ivan
Ivan